This is a list of republics. For antiquity (or later in the case of societies that did not refer to modern terminology to qualify their form of government) the assessment of whether a state organisation is a republic is based on retrospective analysis by historians and political theorists. For more recent systems of government, worldwide organisations with a broad political acceptance (such as the United Nations), can provide information on whether or not a sovereign state is referred to as a republic.

List by period

Antiquity

Middle Ages

 Most Serene Republic of San Marino (since 301, constitutional since 1600)
Qarmatians (899–1067)
Gotland (?–1285)
Upstalsboom League (c. 12th century–15th century)
 Icelandic Commonwealth (930–1262)
 Couto Misto (c. 1000 – 1868)
Taifa of Córdoba (1031–1070)
 Republic of Florence (1115–1537)
 Republic of Siena (1125–1557)
 Novgorod Republic (1136–1478)
 Commune of Rome (1144–1193)
 Most Serene Republic of Lucca (1160–1805)
 Haudenosaunee (c. 13th century–1794)
Republic of Massa (1225–1336)
 Republic of Sassari (1275–1323)
 Old Swiss Confederacy (1291–1798)
Republic of Poljica (1322–1806)
 Republic of Senarica (1343–1797)
 Pskov Republic (1348–1510)
 Confederacy of Tlaxcala (1348–1520)
Dithmarschen (c. 1400 – 1559)
 Republic of Cospaia (1440–1826)
 Golden Ambrosian Republic (1447–1450)

Maritime republics
A maritime republic was a thalassocratic city-state during the Middle Ages in which the merchant class had considerable power.

 Most Serene Republic of Venice (697–1797)
Republic of Gaeta (839–1140)
 Republic of Amalfi (839–1131)
Bajjāna (886–922)
 Republic of Ancona (c. 1000 – 1532)
 Republic of Pisa (c. 1000 – 1406, 1494–1509)
 Most Serene Republic of Genoa (c. 1100 – 1797)
 Republic of Noli (1192–1797)
 Republic of Ragusa (1358–1808)

Free imperial cities
A free imperial city was a self-ruling city member of the Holy Roman Empire that was represented in the Imperial Diet.

 Free Imperial City of Worms  (c. 11th century–1789)
 Free Imperial City of Goslar (1081–1802)
 (1166–1801)
 Free Imperial City of Ulm (de jure: 1290–1803; de facto: 1184–1803)
 Free Imperial City of Besançon (1184–1654)
 (1189–1806;)
 Free Imperial City of Konstanz (1192–1548)
 Free Imperial City of Wetzlar (c. 12th century–1803)
 Free Imperial City of Friedberg (1211–1806)
 Free Imperial City of Nördlingen (1215–1803)
 Free Imperial City of Nuremberg (1219–1806)
 Free Imperial City of Nordhausen (1220–1802)
 Free Imperial City of Pfullendorf (1220–1803)
 Free Imperial City of Lübeck (1226–1811)
 Free Imperial City of Rheinfelden (1225–1330)
 Free Imperial City of Colmar (1226–1679)
 Free Imperial City of Esslingen (1229–1802/3)
 Free Imperial City of Offenburg (c. 1240–1803)
 Free Imperial City of Reutlingen (1240–1803)
 Free Imperial City of Bopfingen (1241–1802)
 Free Imperial City of Mainz (1241–1462)
 Free Imperial City of Regensburg (1245–1486; 1496–1803)
 Free Imperial City of Schweinfurt (1245–1803)
 Free Imperial City of Windsheim (1248–1802)
 Free Imperial City of Buchau (c. 1250–1803)
 Free Imperial City of Mühlhausen (1251–1803)
 Free Imperial City of Strasbourg (1262–1681)
 Free Imperial City of Memmigen (1268–1802)
 Free Imperial City of Rottweil (1268–1802)
 Free Imperial City of Überlingen (1268–1803)
 Free Imperial City of Gmünd (1268–1802)
 Free Imperial City of Rothenburg (1274–1803)
 Free Imperial City of Buchhorn (1275–1803)
 Free Imperial City of Lindau (1275–1802)
 Free Imperial City of Weil (1275–1803)
 Free Imperial City of Augsburg (1276–1803)
 Free Imperial City of Ravensburg (1276–1803)
 Free Imperial City of Hall (1280–1802)
 Free Imperial City of Biberach an der Riß (1281–1803)
 Free Imperial City of Kaufbeuren (1286–1803)
 Free Imperial City of Wangen (1286–1802)
 Free Imperial City of Cologne (1288–1801)
 Free Imperial City of Kempten (1289–1802/3)
 Free Imperial City of Dortmund (1293–1803)
 Free Imperial City of Leutkirch (1293–1803)
 Free Imperial City of Speyer (1294–1792)
 Free Imperial City of Weißenburg (1296–1802)
 Free Imperial City of Zell am Harmersbach (c. 14th century–1803)
 Free Imperial City of Wimpfen (c. 1300–1803)
 Free Imperial City of Donauwörth (1308–1607)
 Free Imperial City of Mühlhausen (1347–1798)
 Free Imperial City of Dinkelsbühl (1351–1802)
 Free Imperial City of Aalen (1360–1803)
 Free Imperial City of Gengenbach (1360–1803)
 Free Imperial City of Isny (1365–1803)
 Free Imperial City of Bremen (de jure: 1654–1811; de facto: 1366–1811)
 Free Imperial City of Heilbronn (1371–1802)
 Free Imperial City of Frankfurt (1372–1806)
 Free Imperial City of Giengen (1391–1803)
 Free Imperial City of Diessenhofen (1415–1460)
 Republic of Gersau (1433–1798)
 Free Imperial City of Soest (1449–1616)

Early modernity

Zaporizhian Sich (1552–1775)
 Polish–Lithuanian Commonwealth (1569–1795)
 (1581–1795)
Saint-Malo (1590–1594)
 Republic of Salé (1619–1668)
 Catalan Republic (1641)
 Cossack Hetmanate (1649–1764)
 Commonwealth of England (1649–1660)
 Republic of Pirates (1706–1718)
 Corsican Republic (1755–1769)
Republic of Paulava (1769–1795)
 (since 1776, constitutional since 1789)
 Lanfang Republic (1777–1884)
 Vermont Republic (1777–1791)
 First French Republic (1792–1804)
 Republic of Swellendam (1795)
 Republic of Graaff-Reinet (1795–1796)
 State of Muskogee (1799–1803)

Sister republics
A sister republic was a client state of France established by French armies or by local revolutionaries and assisted by the First French Republic during the French Revolutionary Wars.

 Republic of Liège (1789–1791)
 United Belgian States (1790)
Rauracian Republic (1792–1793)
 Republic of Mainz (1793)
 Republic of Bouillon (1794–1795)
 Batavian Republic (1795–1806)
 Republic of Alba (1796)
Bolognese Republic (1796)
Republic of Reggio (1796)
 Cispadane Republic (1796–1797)
 Transpadane Republic (1796–1797)
Republic of Asti (1797)
Republic of Bergamo (1797)
Republic of Brescia (1797)
 Republic of Crema (1797)
 Anconine Republic (1797–1798)
 Cisalpine Republic (1797–1802)
 Cisrhenian Republic (1797–1802)
 Ligurian Republic (1797–1805)
Lemanic Republic (1798)
 Tiberina Republic (1798)
 Republic of Connacht (1798)
 Piedmontese Republic (1798–1799)
 (1798–1802)
 Roman Republic (1798–1799)
 Republic of Pescara (1799)
 Parthenopean Republic (1799)
 Republic of Lucca (1799–1805)
 Subalpine Republic (1800–1802)
 Italian Republic (1802–1805)
 Rhodanic Republic (1802–1810)
 Swiss Confederation (1803–1815)
 Republic of Ragusa (1806–1808)
 Free City of Danzig (1807–1814)

Modernity

19th century
Africa

 Republic of Liberia (since 1847)
 Republic of Maryland (1853–1857)
 (1854–1902)
 South African Republic (1856–1877; 1881–1902)

North America

 First Republic of Haiti (1806–1811)
 State of Haiti (1810–1811)
 Republic of West Florida (1810)
 Republic of East Florida (1812)
 Republic of the Floridas (1817)
 Republic of Spanish Haiti (1821–1822)
 Federal Republic of Central America (1823–1841)
 First Mexican United States (1824–1835)
Republic of Madawaska (1827)
Republic of Indian Stream (1832–1835)
 Centralist Republic of Mexico (1835–1846)
 (1836–1845)
 Republic of Canada (1837–1838)
 State of Los Altos (1838–1840; 1848–1849)
 Republic of Lower Canada (1838)
 Free State of Costa Rica (1838–1847)
 Republic of Honduras (1838–1896)
 Republic of Nicaragua (1838–1896)
 Republic of the Rio Grande (1840)
 (1840–1843; 1846–1848)
 Republic of Guatemala (since 1840)
 Republic of El Salvador (1841–1896)
 First Dominican Republic (1844–1861)
 California Republic (June–July 1846)
 Second Mexican United States (1846–1863)
 First Costa Rican Republic (1848–1948)
 State of Deseret (1849–1850)
 Republic of Baja California (15 October 1853–January 1854)
 Republic of Sonora (15 October 1853 – 8 May 1854)
 Second Republic of Haiti (since 1859)
 Confederate States of America (1860–1865)
 Second Dominican Republic (1865–1916)
 United States of Mexico (since 1867)
Republic of Manitobah (1867–1869)
 United States of Central America (1896–1898)
 Republic of El Salvador (since 1898)
 Republic of Honduras (since 1898)
 Republic of Nicaragua (since 1898)

South America

 Republic of Paraguay (since 1811)
 American Confederation of Venezuela (1811–1819)
 United Provinces of the Río de la Plata (1816–1831)
 Republic of Chile (since 1818)
 Republic of Gran Colombia (1819–1831)
 Free Province of Guayaquil (1820–1829)
 Republic of Entre Ríos (1820–1821)
Republic of Tucumán (1820–1821)
 Republic of Peru (1824–1836)
 Republic of Bolivia (1825–1836)
 Oriental Republic of Uruguay (since 1828)
 Republic of Ecuador (since 1830)
 State of Venezuela (1830–1864)
 Argentine Confederation (1831–1861)
 Republic of New Granada (1831–1858)
 Republic of South Peru (1836)
 Republic of North Peru (1836)
 Peru–Bolivian Confederation (1836–1839)
 Riograndense Republic (1836–1845)
 Juliana Republic (1839)
 Republic of Peru (since 1839)
 Republic of Bolivia (1839–2009)
 State of Buenos Aires (1852–1861)
 Granadine Confederation (1858–1863)
 Argentine Republic (since 1861)
 United States of Colombia (1863–1886)
 United States of Venezuela (1864–1953)
 Republic of Colombia (since 1886)
 Republic of Independent Guiana (20 July 1886–1891)
 Republic of the United States of Brazil (1889–1930)

Asia

 Republic of Ezo (1868–1869)
 Republic of Formosa (1895)
 Republic of Biak-na-Bato (1897)
 First Philippine Republic (1898–1901)

Europe

 Septinsular Republic (1800–1815)
 Republic of Gersau (1814–1818)
 (1814–1815)
 Swiss Confederation (1814–1848)
 United States of the Ionian Islands (1815–1864)
 Free City of Krakow (1815–1846)
 Free City of Bremen (1815–1871)
 Free City of Hamburg (1815–1871)
 Free City of Lübeck (1815–1871)
 Free City of Frankfurt (1816–1866)
 Neutral Moresnet (1816–1920)
 First Hellenic Republic (1828–1832)
 Second French Republic (1848–1852)
 Swiss Confederation (since 1848)
Free Cities of Menton and Roquebrune (1848–1861)
 Roman Republic (February–April 1849)
 Republic of San Marco (March 1848–August 1849)
 Third French Republic (1871–1940)
 First Spanish Republic (1873–1874)
 Cantons of Alcoy, Algeciras, Alicante, Almansa, Andújar, Bailén, Béjar, Cadiz, Camuñas, Castellón, Córdoba, Granada, Gualchos, Huelva, Jaén, Jumilla, Loja, Málaga, Motril, Murcia, Orihuela, Plasencia, Salamanca, San Fernando, Sevilla, Tarifa, Torrevieja, Valencia (1873) and Cartagena (1873–1874)
Republic of Tamrash (1878–1886)

Oceania

 Independent Commune of Franceville (1889)
 Republic of Hawai'i (1894–1898)

20th century
Africa

 Tripolitanian Republic (16 November 1918–1922)
 Confederal Republic of the Tribes of the Rif (18 September 1921 – 27 May 1926)
 (since 1953)
 (since 1956)
 (since 1957)
 (since 1960)
 (since 1960)
 (since 1960)
 (since 1960)
 (since 1960)
 (since 1961)
 (since 1961)
 (since 1963)
 (since 1962)
 (since 1962)
 (9 December 1962 – 26 April 1964)
 (since 1963)
 (since 1963)
 (since 1964)
 (since 1964)
 People's Republic of Zanzibar and Pemba (12 January 1964 – 26 April 1964)
 (since 26 April 1964)
 (since 1965)
 (since 1966)
 (since 1966)
 (30 May 1967 – 15 January 1970)
 (since 1968)
 (since 1969)
 (since 1970)
 (2 March 1970 – 11 December 1979)
 (since 1971)
 (since 1974)
 (since 1975)
 (since 1975)
 (since 1975)
 (since 1976)
 (since 1976)
 (26 October 1976 – 27 April 1994)
 (6 December 1977 – 28 April 1994)
 (13 September 1979 – 28 April 1994)
 (since 1980)
 (4 December 1981 – 28 April 1994)
 (since 1990)
 (since 1991)
 (since 1992)

America

 Republic of Acre (1st: 15 July 1899 – 15 March 1900; 2nd: November 1900–24 December 1900 3rd: 27 January 1903 – 11 November 1903)
 Republic of Cuba (since 20 May 1902)
 Republic of Panama (since 3 November 1903)
 First United States of Brazil (16 July 1934 – 29 October 1945)
 Second United States of Brazil (31 January 1946 – 31 March 1964)
 Second Republic of Costa Rica (since 7 November 1949)
 Third Dominican Republic (1924–12 July 1965)
 Republic of Venezuela (11 April 1953 – 15 December 1999)
 Fourth Dominican Republic (since 1 July 1966)
 Republic of Anguilla (12 July 1967 – 19 March 1969)
 Co-operative Republic of Guyana (since 23 February 1970)
 Republic of Suriname (since 25 November 1975)
 Republic of Trinidad and Tobago (since 1 August 1976)
 Commonwealth of Dominica (since 3 November 1978)
 Federative Republic of Brazil (since 15 March 1985)
 Bolivarian Republic of Venezuela (since 15 December 1999)

Asia

Urjanchai Republic (1 December 1911 – 17 April 1914)
 Republic of China (since 1 January 1912, since 7 December 1949 only in Taiwan)
 Transcaucasian Democratic Federative Republic (22 April 1918 – 28 May 1918)
 (28 May 1918 – 2 December 1920)
 Democratic Republic of Azerbaijan (28 May 1918 – 28 April 1920)
 Kars Republic (1 December 1918 – 19 April 1919)
 Republic of Aras (December 1918 – Mid-June 1919)
 Azerbaijan Soviet Socialist Republic (28 April 1920 – 12 March 1922)
 Armenian Soviet Socialist Republic (2 December 1920 – 12 March 1922)
 Republic of Mountainous Armenia (26 April 1921 – 13 July 1921)
 Tuvan People's Republic (14 August 1921 – 11 October 1944)
 Republic of Turkey (since 29 October 1923)
 (24 November 1924 – 13 February 1992)
 (15 November 1935 – 4 July 1946)
 Second Philippine Republic (14 November 1943 – 11 June 1945)
 Lebanese Republic (de jure: since 22 November 1943; de facto: since 31 December 1946)
 Republic of Indonesia (since 17 August 1945) Republic of the Union of Myanmar (since 4 January 1948)
 Third Philippine Republic (4 July 1946 – 30 December 1965)
 State of Israel (since 14 May 1948)
 (since 15 August 1948)
 Democratic People's Republic of Korea (since 9 September 1948)
 (since 2 September 1945)
 (26 October 1955 – 30 April 1975)
 (since 1 October 1949)
 Republic of South Maluku (15 April 1950 – 12 April 1963)
 Republic of India (since 26 January 1950)
 (since 1956)
 (since 1958)
 (since 1960)
 (since 1965)
 Fourth Philippine Republic (30 December 1965–22/25 February 1986)
 (since 1990)
 (since 1968)
 (since 1971)
 (since 1972)
 (1973–1992)
 (since 1975)
 (since 1979)
 (since 1983)
 Republic of the Philippines (since 22/25 February 1986)
 (since 1988)
 (since 1991)
 (since 1991)
 (since 1991)
 (since 1991)
 (since 1992)
 (since 1992)
 (since 2008) Europe Kruševo Republic (3 August 1903 – 13 August 1903)
 First Portuguese Republic (5 October 1910 – 26 May 1926)
 Independent Government of Western Thrace (31 August 1913 – 25 October 1913)
 Republic of Finland (since 6 December 1917)
 Russian Republic (1917)
 Ukrainian People's Republic (25 January 1917 – 29 April 1918; 14 December 1918–18 March 1921)
 Mountainous Republic of the Northern Caucasus (11 May 1917–January 1921)
 Crimean People's Republic (13 December 1917–January 1918)
 Moldavian Democratic Republic (6 February 1918 – 10 December 1918)
 Kuban People's Republic (16 February 1918 – 17 March 1920)
 Belarusian People's Republic (9 March 1918–1919)
 Republic of Turkey (since 29 October 1923)
 (16 February 1918 – 3 August 1940)
 (24 February 1918 – 6 August 1940)
 Don Republic (18 May 1918–1920)
 (26 May 1918 – 25 April 1921)
 Commonwealth of Zakopane (13 October 1918 – 16 November 1918)
 West Ukrainian People's Republic (18 October 1918 – 22 January 1919)
 Komancza Republic (4 November 1918 – 24 January 1919)
 Republic of Tarnobrzeg (6 November 1918–Spring 1919)
 People's State of Bavaria (8 November 1918 – 6 April 1919)
 Republic of German-Austria (12 November 1918 – 10 September 1919)
 Second Polish Republic (16 November 1918 – 6 October 1939)
 (18 November 1918 – 5 August 1940)
 First Czechoslovak Republic (28 October 1918 – 30 September 1938)
 Lemko-Rusyn People's Republic (5 December 1918–March 1920)
 First Austrian Republic (10 September 1919 – 1 May 1934)
 Free State of Fiume (12 November 1920 – 22 February 1924)
 Republic of Central Lithuania (12 October 1920 – 24 March 1922)
 (15 November 1920 – 2 September 1939)
 Georgian Soviet Socialist Republic (25 February 1921 – 12 March 1922)
 Union of Soviet Socialist Republics (1922–1991)
 Second Hellenic Republic (1924–1935)
 Catalan Republic (14 April 1931 – 17 April 1931)
 Second Spanish Republic (de facto: 1931–1939; de jure: 1931–1975)
 (since 29 December 1949)
 Second Czechoslovak Republic (30 September 1938 – 15 March 1939)
 Carpatho-Ukraine (30 December 1938 – 18 March 1939)
 Slovak State (14 March 1939 – 4 April 1945)
 Fourth French Republic (1946–1958)
 (since 2 June 1946)
 (est. 1946)
 (est. 1947, communist government from 1948 to 1989)
 Fifth French Republic (since 1958)
 Third Hellenic Republic (since 1974)
 (since 1974)
 (since 1990)
 (since 11 March 1990)
 (since 20 August 1991)
 (since 21 August 1991)Oceania (1961–1963)
 Independent State of Samoa (since 1 January 1962)
 Republic of Nauru (since 31 January 1968)
 Republic of Palau (since 2 April 1979)
 Republic of the Marshall Islands (since 1979)
 Republic of Kiribati (since 12 July 1979)
 Republic of Vanuatu (since 30 July 1980)
 Federated States of Micronesia (since 3 November 1986)
 Republic of Fiji (since 7 October 1987)

21st century and later

 Democratic Republic of Timor-Leste (since 20 May 2002)
 Islamic Republic of Afghanistan (9 October 2004 – 15 August 2021)
 Republic of Kosovo (since 17 February 2008)
 Federal Democratic Republic of Nepal (since 28 May 2008)
 Plurinational State of Bolivia (since 7 February 2009)
 State of Libya (since 17 February 2011)
 Republic of South Sudan (since 9 July 2011)
 Barbados' (since 30 November 2021)

List by type
In modern usage, a republican system of government is loosely applied to any state which claims this designation. For example, the Dominican Republic under Rafael Trujillo is considered a republic, as is the Republic of Iraq under Saddam Hussein.

Arab republics
 Tripolitanian Republic (1918–1922)
 Arab Republic of Egypt (1953–present)
 Syrian Arab Republic (1946–present)
 Sahrawi Arab Democratic Republic (1976–present)
 United Arab Republic (1958–1971)
 Yemen Arab Republic (1962–1990)
 Libyan Arab Republic (1969–1977)

Confederal republics
Confederal republics are associations of sovereign states, usually having power over critical common issues such as defense and foreign policy:
 Confederate States of America (1861–1865)
Senegambia Confederation (1982–1989)
 United States of America (under the Second Continental Congress and the Articles of Confederation, 1776–1789)

Crowned republics
A crowned republic, is a form of constitutional monarchy where the monarch's role is commonly seen as largely ceremonial and where all the royal prerogatives are prescribed by custom and law in such a way that the monarch has limited discretion over governmental and constitutional issues.

 United Kingdom (1707–present)
 Kingdom of Norway (1905–present)
 Commonwealth of Australia (1986–present)
 Realm of New Zealand (1947–present)
 Japan (1952–present)
 Canada (1982–present)
 Kingdom of Greece (1864–1967)
 (1910–1961)
 (1957–1963)
 (1963–present)
 (1932–present)

Democratic republics
Democratic republics are usually socialist states although not all of them are necessarily socialist.

 Democratic People's Republic of Korea (1948–present)
 Democratic Republic of the Congo (1966–1971, 1997–present)
 Democratic Republic of São Tomé and Príncipe (1975–present)
 Democratic Republic of Timor-Leste (1975–present)
 Democratic Republic of Vietnam (1945–1975)
 Sahrawi Arab Democratic Republic (1976–present)
 Democratic Socialist Republic of Sri Lanka (1978–present)
 Federal Democratic Republic of Ethiopia (1991–present)
 Federal Democratic Republic of Nepal (2008–present)
 German Democratic Republic (1949–1990)
 Lao People's Democratic Republic (1975–present)
 People's Democratic Republic of Algeria (1962–present)
 People's Democratic Republic of Yemen (1967–1990)

Federal republics
Federal republics are federal states in which the administrative divisions (states or provinces) theoretically retain a degree of autonomy which is constitutionally protected, and cannot be revoked unilaterally by the national government. Federal republics are not unitary states.

 Bolivarian Republic of Venezuela
 Bosnia and Herzegovina (since 1995)
 Commonwealth of England (1649–1653)
 Czechoslovakia: Czechoslovak Socialist Republic (1969–1990), Czech and Slovak Federative Republic (1990–1992)
 Federal Democratic Republic of Ethiopia (unitary republic 1974–1994; federal republic since 1994)
 Federal Republic of Cameroon (1961–1972)
 Federal Republic of Somalia (since August 2012)
 Federative Republic of Brazil (since 15 November 1889)
 Federal Republic of Germany (since 1918)
 Gran Colombia (Republic of Colombia) (1819–1886), known as Great Colombia from 1819 to 1831, when it included present-day Ecuador, Venezuela and Panama.
 Islamic Republic of Pakistan (since 1956; declaration of the Islamic Republic'')
 Second Federal Republic of Mexico (1846–1864)
 United Mexican States (since 1917)
 Federal Democratic Republic of Nepal (since 2007)
 Federal Republic of Nigeria (1963–66:1st Republic, 1979–83: 2nd Republic, 1993: 3rd Republic, 1999–present: 4th Republic)
 Argentine Republic (since 1852)
 Republic of India (since 26 January 1950)
 Republic of South Sudan (since 9 July 2011)
 Republic of Sudan (since 1 January 1956)
 Republic of Austria
 Russian Federation (since November 7, 1917; up to 1991 it was named Russian Soviet Federative Socialist Republic)
 State Union of Serbia and Montenegro (2003–2006)
 Swiss Confederation (1848–present), a federal republic but called the Swiss Confederation
 Union of Soviet Socialist Republics (1922–1991)
 United Provinces of Central America (1823–1840)
 United States of America (since 1789)
 United States of Indonesia (1949–1950)
 Yugoslavia: Federal People's Republic of Yugoslavia (1946–1963), Socialist Federal Republic of Yugoslavia (1963–1992), Federal Republic of Yugoslavia (1992–2003)

Islamic republics
Republics governed in accordance with Islamic law:
 Islamic Republic of Afghanistan (2004–2021)
 Islamic Republic of Iran (since 1979)
 Islamic Republic of Mauritania (since 1960)
 Islamic Republic of Pakistan (since 1956)

People's republics
People's republics are said to be governed by the people. The name is most often (but not always) used by communist states.

Current people's republics

 Democratic People's Republic of Korea
 People's Democratic Republic of Algeria
 Lao People's Democratic Republic
 People's Republic of Bangladesh
 People's Republic of China

Former people's republics

 Federal People's Republic of Yugoslavia (1946–1963)
 Great Socialist People's Libyan Arab Jamahiriya (1977–2011)
 Mongolian People's Republic (1924–1992)
 People's Democratic Republic of Yemen (1967–1970)
 People's Republic of Albania (1946–1976)
 People's Republic of Angola (1975–1992)
 People's Republic of Benin (1975–1990)
 People's Republic of Bulgaria (1946–1990)
 People's Republic of the Congo (1970–1992)
 People's Republic of Hungary (1949–1989)
 People's Republic of Mozambique (1975–1990)
 People's Republic of Poland (1952–1989)
 People's Democratic Republic of Ethiopia (1987–1991)
 Romanian People's Republic (1947–1965)

Socialist republics
These are republics that use the word "socialist" in their official name.

 Armenian Soviet Socialist Republic (1920–1990)
 Azerbaijan Soviet Socialist Republic (1920–1991)
 Byelorussian Soviet Socialist Republic (1920–1991)
 Czechoslovak Socialist Republic (1960–1990)
 Democratic Socialist Republic of Sri Lanka
 Great Socialist People's Libyan Arab Jamahiriya (1977–2011)
 Socialist Federal Republic of Yugoslavia (1963–1992)
 People's Socialist Republic of Albania (1976–1990)
 Socialist Republic of Romania (1965–1989)
 Socialist Republic of Vietnam (since 1976)
 Ukrainian Soviet Socialist Republic (1919–1991)
 Union of Soviet Socialist Republics (1922–1991)

Unitary republics
Unitary republics are unitary states which are governed constitutionally as one single unit, with a single constitutionally created legislature. Unitary states are not federations or confederations.

 Republic of Abkhazia (since 1992)
 Islamic Republic of Afghanistan (republic since 1973)
 Republic of Acre (1st: 1899–1900; 2nd: 1900; 3rd: 1903)
 Republic of Albania (since 1946)
 People's Democratic Republic of Algeria
 Republic of Angola (since 1975)
 Republic of Armenia (1st: 28 May 1918; Current: 25 December 1991)
 Republic of Azerbaijan (1st: 28 May 1918; re-established: 18 October 1991)
 People's Republic of Bangladesh
 Barbados (since 30 November 2021)
 Republic of Benin
 Republic of Bophuthatswana (1977–1994)
 Plurinational State of Bolivia
 Republic of Botswana (since 1966)
 Republic of Bulgaria (since 1946)

 Republic of the Union of Myanmar (Burma)
 Republic of Burundi (since 1966)
 Republic of Cameroon
 Republic of Cape Verde
 Republic of Chad
 (1958–1976; restored 1979)
 Republic of Chile
 People's Republic of China
 Republic of China (Taiwan)
 Republic of Ciskei (1981–1994)
 Republic of Colombia (unitary republic since 1886)
 Democratic Republic of the Congo
 Republic of the Congo
 Corsican Republic (1755–1769)
Cospaia (1440–1826)
 Republic of Costa Rica
 Republic of Croatia
 Republic of Cuba
 Republic of Cyprus

 Commonwealth of Dominica
 (1821–1822, 1844–1861, 1865–present)
 (since 2014)
 Republic of Djibouti
 Republic of Ecuador
 Arab Republic of Egypt (since 1953)
 Republic of El Salvador (1821–present)
 Republic of Equatorial Guinea
 State of Eritrea
 Republic of Estonia (since 1918)
Republic of Ezo (1868–1869)
 Independent Commune of Franceville (1889)
 Republic of Fiji (since 1987)
 Republic of Finland (since 1919)
Finnish Democratic Republic (1 December 1939 to 12 March 1940)
 Republic of Formosa (1895)
 French Republic
 Gabonese Republic
 Republic of the Gambia (since 1970)

 Republic of Ghana (since 1960)
 Hellenic Republic (First Hellenic Republic (1822–1832))
 Republic of Guatemala
 Republic of Guinea
 Republic of Guinea-Bissau
 Co-operative Republic of Guyana (since 1970)
 Republic of Haiti (1806–1849; restored 1859)
 Republic of Hawaii (1894–1898)
 Republic of Honduras
 Republic of Hungary (since 1946)
 Republic of Iceland (republic since 1944)
 Republic of Indonesia (unitary republic since August 1950)
 (since 14 May 1948)
 Italian Republic (since 1946)
 Italian Social Republic (1943–1945)
 Islamic Republic of Iran (since 1979)
 Republic of Iraq (since 1958)
 (since 1949)
 Republic of Ivory Coast
 Republic of Kazakhstan
 Republic of Kenya (since 1964)
 Republic of Kiribati (since 1979)
 Republic of Kosovo (since 2008)
 Republic of Korea (since 1948)
 Democratic People's Republic of Korea (since 1948)
 Kyrgyz Republic
 Lao People's Democratic Republic (since 1975)
 Republic of Latvia
 Republic of Lebanon (22 November 1943)
 Republic of Liberia
 Great Socialist People's Libyan Arab Jamahiriya (1969–2011)
 Republic of Lithuania
 Lokot Republic (1941–1943)
 (since 2014)
 Republic of Madagascar
 Republic of Malaŵi (since 1966)
 Republic of Maldives (since 1968)
 Republic of Mali (since 1960)
 Republic of Malta (since 1974)
 Republic of the Marshall Islands (since 1979)
 Islamic Republic of Mauritania
 Republic of Mauritius (since 1992)
Menton and Roquebrune (1848–1861)
 Republic of Moldova
 State of Mongolia (since 1924)
 Republic of Montenegro (since 2006)
 Republic of Mozambique
 State of Muskogee (1799–1803)
 Republic of Namibia
 Republic of Nauru
 Republic of Nicaragua
 Republic of Niger
 Republic of North Macedonia (since 1991)
 Republic of Palau (since 1981)
 Republic of Panama
 Republic of Paraguay
 Republic of Peru
 Republic of the Philippines (since 1946)
 Republic of Poland
 Portuguese Republic (since 1910)
 Republic of Rhodesia (1970–1979)
 (since 1947)
 Republic of Rwanda (since 1961)
 Independent State of Samoa (since 1962)
 Most Serene Republic of San Marino (since 301)
 Democratic Republic of São Tomé and Príncipe
 Republic of Senegal
 Republic of Serbia
 Republic of Seychelles
 Republic of Sierra Leone (since 1971)
 Republic of Singapore (since 1965)
 Slovak Republic (1939–1945)
 Republic of Slovenia
 Republic of South Africa (since 1961)
 Republic of South Ossetia (since 1991)
 Republic of Spain (1931–1939)
 Democratic Socialist Republic of Sri Lanka (since 1972)
 Republic of Suriname
 Syrian Arab Republic
 Republic of Tajikistan
 United Republic of Tanzania
 Republic of Texas (1836–1845)
 Democratic Republic of Timor-Leste
 Togolese Republic
 Republic of Transkei (1976–1994)
 Pridnestrovian Moldavian Republic
 Republic of Trinidad and Tobago (since 1976)
 Tunisian Republic (since 1957)
 Republic of Turkey (republic since 1923)
 Republic of Turkmenistan
 Republic of Uganda (since 1963)

 Republic of Upper Volta (1958–1984)
 Oriental Republic of Uruguay
 Republic of Uzbekistan
 Republic of Vanuatu
 Republic of Venda (1979–1994)
 Vermont Republic (1777–1791)
 Republic of Vietnam (1955–1975)
 Republic of West Florida (1810)
 Republic of Yemen (since 1962)
 Republic of Zambia (since 1964)
 Republic of Zimbabwe

See also
 Republicanism

References

Further reading

External links
 

Republics